Mazzeo Island is an island  west-northwest of Quintana Island in the Wilhelm Archipelago, Antarctica. It was named by the UK Antarctic Place-Names Committee for Lieutenant Peter Mazzeo, second survey officer on  working in this area in February 1969.

See also 
 List of Antarctic and sub-Antarctic islands

References

Islands of the Wilhelm Archipelago